Hon'inbō Jōsaku (本因坊丈策, 1803–1847) was a Japanese professional go player and the thirteenth head of the Hon'inbō school. He was not in the same top-rank class over the board as either his predecessor Jōwa or his successor Shūwa.

References

1801 births
1847 deaths
Japanese Go players